Ihab El Sayed Abdelrahman (born 1 May 1989) is an Egyptian track and field athlete who competes in the javelin throw. His personal best of 89.21 m is the Egyptian record. El Sayed splits his time between Kuortane, Finland, where his coach Petteri Piironen is based, and Cairo, where he is a student. In 2016, he tested positive for a banned substance, and was banned from the 2016 Olympics. He competed at the 2020 Summer Olympics.

Achievements

Seasonal bests by year
 2007 – 71.15
 2008 – 76.20
 2009 – 78.44
 2010 – 81.84
 2011 – 78.83
 2012 – 82.25
 2013 – 83.62
 2014 – 89.21 
 2015 – 88.99

References

External links

 
 

1989 births
Living people
Egyptian male javelin throwers
Olympic athletes of Egypt
Athletes (track and field) at the 2012 Summer Olympics
Athletes (track and field) at the 2016 Summer Olympics
World Athletics Championships athletes for Egypt
World Athletics Championships medalists
Mediterranean Games silver medalists for Egypt
Athletes (track and field) at the 2013 Mediterranean Games
African Games gold medalists for Egypt
African Games medalists in athletics (track and field)
People from Sharqia Governorate
Egyptian sportspeople in doping cases
Mediterranean Games medalists in athletics
Athletes (track and field) at the 2011 All-Africa Games
Athletes (track and field) at the 2015 African Games
IAAF Continental Cup winners
Islamic Solidarity Games medalists in athletics
Islamic Solidarity Games competitors for Egypt
Athletes (track and field) at the 2020 Summer Olympics
African Championships in Athletics winners
Athletes (track and field) at the 2022 Mediterranean Games